Agrilus granulatus, the granulate poplar borer, is a species of metallic wood-boring beetle in the family Buprestidae. It is found in North America.

Subspecies
These four subspecies belong to the species Agrilus granulatus:
 Agrilus granulatus granulatus (Say, 1823)
 Agrilus granulatus liragus Barter & Brown, 1949
 Agrilus granulatus mojavei Knull, 1952
 Agrilus granulatus populi Fisher, 1928

References

Further reading

 
 
 

granulatus
Beetles of North America
Taxa named by Thomas Say
Beetles described in 1823
Articles created by Qbugbot